Czyże  (Podlachian: Čyžê) is a village in Hajnówka County, Podlaskie Voivodeship, in north-eastern Poland. It is the seat of the gmina (administrative district) called Gmina Czyże.

The village has a population of 590.

References

Villages in Hajnówka County